Amila Sampath Abeysekara (born 7 March 1983), is an actor in Sri Lankan cinema and television. Mostly engaged in television, Abeysakara is best known for the role Amantha in the serial Paba, where he won the most popular actor award in 2009. He has also hosted four seasons in the reality show Derana Dream Star.

Personal life
Amila Abeysekara was born in Kandy. At the age of 10, they moved to Maharagama. He has two younger brothers. He started to education from Dharmaraja College, Kandy, and then moved to President's College, Maharagama. He played cricket in school times, where he continued to play for clubs before entering to acting. He is married to longtime partner Theja Jayawardena. The wedding was celebrated in 2010, however wedding was registered in 2004. She is currently working as a flight attendant in Emirates airline.

Career
In 1998, Abeysekara got the opportunity as an arbitrator at Swarnavahini. He started acting career in 2000 with the blockbuster serial Depath Nai. His maiden cinema acting came through 2008 film Hathara Denama Soorayo which is a remake of 1971 blockbuster of the same name directed by Neil Rupasinghe. He played the character Linton in that movie as a supportive role. In 2012, he acted in Sihinaya Dige Enna as the lead actor.

He hosted the musical program Rhythm Chat telecast on Jathika Rupavahini.

Selected television serials

 Adaraneeya Chanchala 
 Adara Wassa
 Aththai Me Adare
 Depath Nai
 Diriya Doni
 Ektam Ge
 Giri Shikara Meda
 Googly
 Mini Muthu
 Muthu Palasa
 Nethaka Maayavee 
 Night Learners
 Paba
 Pini Wassak
 Ridi Pahan
 Sanda Eliya
 Sasara Seya
 Sathweni Dawasa
 Saveena
 Senehasa Kaviyak
 Sihinayak Paata Paatin
 Sith Bindi Rekha 
 Situ Gedara
 Sonduru Dadayakkaraya
 Susumaka Ima
 Thurumpu Asiya
 Wasanthaya Aran Evith 
 Wassa Numba Wagei

Filmography

Awards

Raigam Tele'es

|-
||2009 ||| Paba || Most Popular Actor ||

References

External links
 Amila Abeysekara Wedding photos
 බිරිඳ සේවය කරන ගුවන් යානයේම ගිය අමිල
 අමිල අපහාස කලා යයි පවසන පුවත
 අමිල නයනාට වැඳ සමාව ගනි කියන කතාව
 අමිල වැඳ සමාව ගත්තේ නෑ ලු
 නිළියෝ වැරදි ව්‍යාපාර කරනවා - Amila abeysekara
 අමිල අබේසේකර - Hiru Gossip
 අර නිළියට වඩා වැඩියෙන් ගාණ කියන්න ඕනෙ" කියලා හිතුවොත් අපිට ගෙදරටම වෙලා ඉන්න වෙන්නෙ..." – අමිල අබේසේකර

Sri Lankan male film actors
Living people
Sinhalese male actors
1983 births
Alumni of Dharmaraja College